Bhiwandi East Assembly constituency is one of the 288 Vidhan Sabha (legislative assembly) constituencies of Maharashtra state, western India. This constituency is located in Thane district.

Geographical scope
The constituency comprises ward nos. 6 to
17, 36 to 50 and 62 to 65, of Bhiwandi-Nizampur Municipal Corporation and Bhinar saja in Bhiwandi revenue circle all a part of Bhiwandi taluka.

List of Members of Legislative Assembly

^ by-poll

ELection Result

Assembly Elections 2009

Assembly Bye Elections 2010

Assembly Elections 2014

References

Assembly constituencies of Thane district
Assembly constituencies of Maharashtra